Bob Hitchens (January 30, 1952 – July 7, 2020) was an American college football player who was a running back at Miami University in Oxford, Ohio, from 1971–1973.

College career

Hitchens rushed for a career 3,118 yards with 34 touchdowns as a tailback during his career and was a three year letter winner for Miami.

In 1972 Hitchens rushed for 1,370 yards on 326 carries scoring 15 touchdowns earning AP All-American honors, the 1972 Mid-American Conference offensive player of the year and 1972 Miami RedHawks athlete of the year. His 1,370 yards led the MAC and ranked second in the NCAA Division I Football Bowl Subdivision.

Hitchens helped lead Miami to an 11-0 season as a co-captain his senior year that included an Mid-American Conference title and a Tangerine Bowl victory over the University of Florida.

He holds the Miami RedHawks football statistical leaders single game record for most rushes with 45 against South Carolina Gamecocks in 1972, ranks fourth in career rushing attempts (773), fourth in rushing yards (3,118), third in rushing touchdowns (34), fourth in 100-yard games (14) and is sixth in total scoring (204 points).

Hitchens was inducted into the Miami University Hall of Fame in 1980.

Professional career
Following graduation, Hitchens played professional football for two years with the New England Patriots, Kansas City Chiefs and Pittsburgh Steelers.

Coaching career
Hitchens served as an assistant football coach and helped lead Carnegie-Mellon University to three President's Conference championships and two semi-final finishes in the NCAA District III playoffs.  He joined Miami's staff as an assistant football coach from 1980 to 1987.

References

1950s births
2020 deaths
African-American players of American football
African-American coaches of American football
Kansas City Chiefs players
Miami RedHawks football coaches
Miami RedHawks football players
New England Patriots players
Pittsburgh Steelers players
Carnegie Mellon Tartans football coaches
21st-century African-American people